Brian M. Kolb (born August 14, 1952) is an American politician who served as a member of the New York State Assembly for the 131st district from 2000 to 2021. Kolb also served as minority leader from 2009 to 2020.

Early life and education
Kolb was born in Rochester, New York. He received his Associate of Arts degree from Saint Petersburg Junior College in 1980. In 1996, he received his Bachelor of Science from Roberts Wesleyan College, and later earned his Master of Science from Roberts Wesleyan in 1998.

Career 
He became an adjunct professor at Roberts Wesleyan in 2000. He was co-founder of North American Filter Corporation and is a former president and COO of the Refractron Technologies Corporation.

From 1986 to 1987, Kolb was the town supervisor of Richmond, New York and served on the Ontario County Board of Supervisors.

New York State Assembly
Kolb was first elected to the New York State Assembly in a February 2000 special election. As of January 2020, he has been re-elected nine times. Kolb represented the 129th Assembly District from 2000 to 2012, and has represented the 131st Assembly District since 2013. New York's 131st Assembly District comprises all of Ontario County and portions of Seneca County in Upstate New York.

A Republican, Kolb was chosen as Assembly Minority Leader following the resignation of Jim Tedisco. He became Assembly Minority Leader on April 6, 2009. As of December 2018, Kolb was the longest-serving legislative leader in the New York State Legislature.

A member of the National Rifle Association, Kolb appeared alongside the organization's CEO, Wayne LaPierre, at a 2012 lobby day event in Albany. Kolb is also a member of the New York State Rifle & Pistol Association.

In 2017, Kolb was the only one of New York's five state legislative leaders and six statewide elected officials to support New York Proposition 1 (2017), which called for a state constitutional convention. Proposition 1 was defeated at the ballot box, receiving only 16% of the vote.

Kolb is a member of the member of the Advisory Board for the Ontario ARC, a member of the Sons of the American Legion, the Knights of Columbus, the American Irish Legislators Society, Ontario Charities Classic Board of Directors, the Ontario ARC Advisory Board and the New York Farm Bureau.

Kolb stepped down from the position of Assembly Minority Leader on January 3, 2020 after having been arrested for driving while intoxicated several days earlier. In February 2020, Kolb announced that he would not seek re-election to the Assembly in the November 2020 election.

Other potential bids for political office
Kolb had been named as a leading Republican contender in New York's 29th congressional district in 2010; however, he declined to seek the seat after becoming minority leader. Though his potential candidacy was never taken seriously, he also declined an opportunity to run against Kirsten Gillibrand for United States Senate and also declined to run for Congress in 2012, this time against Democrat Kathy Hochul.

On December 12, 2017, Kolb announced his intent to run for Governor of New York in 2018. He withdrew from the gubernatorial race in February 2018.

Personal life
Kolb resides in Canandaigua, New York. He and his wife, Lauren, have three children.

References

External links
New York State Assembly member website
New York Republican Assembly Campaign Committee
Brian M. Kolb: 2004 Politician Profile Campaign funding profile compiled by Opensecrets.org
Response to New York League of Conservation Voters' Questionnaire

|-

|-

1952 births
21st-century American politicians
Living people
Republican Party members of the New York State Assembly
Politicians from Canandaigua, New York
Politicians from Rochester, New York
Roberts Wesleyan University alumni